Carlos Eduardo Ferrari, sometimes known as Cacá, (born 19 February 1979) is a former Brazilian footballer, but also holds Italian nationality.

Career

Great Britain
Cacá signed a short-term deal for Scottish Premier League club Rangers in October 2000, but never appeared for the first team.
His Brazilian club, Mirassol, then loaned him to English club Birmingham City for the 2001–02 season. He made four appearances in the First Division (second tier) in October and November 2001, all as a late substitute, but then faced a long-term foot injury and was released in March 2002.

Spain
Cacá signed for UD Salamanca in February 2003. He played 16 games in the Segunda División. In summer 2003, he signed for La Liga side Albacete Balompié, and then played for clubs in Segunda División B.

In December 2006, he left for Greece and was presented to media on 1 January 2007 along with Pablo Coira. He then played in Paraguay for Cerro Porteño and in Tunisia for Espérance before returning to Segunda División B with Universidad Las Palmas.

South China
He joined South China in January 2009, signed a half-season contract, and scored a hat-trick on his league debut for the team on 8 February 2009 in 8–0 win against Tuen Mun Progoal. He scored 13 goals in 17 appearances, including 7 goals in the AFC Cup group match and Round of 16. On 23 June 2009, after winning 4–0 against Singapore's side Home United in the Round of 16 at AFC Cup 2009 knockout stage, Caca announced this was his last game for South China as he needed to return to his pregnant wife in Brazil. His AFC Cup goals gave him a rank of 78th in "The World's Top Goal Scorer 2009" by the International Federation of Football History & Statistics.

Return to Brazil
In July 2009 he signed a contract until December for Olaria, which he finished as Campeonato Carioca Série B runner-up and promoted to the top division of Rio de Janeiro state. In January 2010 he signed a new contract for the club until the end of the 2010 Campeonato Carioca. Olaria finished third in Group A of the Taça Guanabara (name of the first half mini-league), and entered the play-offs  "Troféu Moisés Mathias de Andrade", which decided the fifth to eighth places of the first half; eventually Olaria won, defeated América then Boavista in the final. But in Taça Rio, the second half of the state league season Olaria just finished seventh in Group A, failed to enter the play-offs.

In May 2010, he signed a contract with Bahia until the end of 2010 Campeonato Brasileiro Série B. He only played once in Série B but played 3 out of first 4 games in 2010 Campeonato do Nordeste.

United Arab Emirates
In August 2010 he left for Kalba.

Retirement and personal life
In early 2011 he retired from football and work for Ronaldo. He is a friend of Ronaldo and played for "Friends of Ronaldo" against "Friends of Zidane" twice, scoring goals in the matches against poverty in 2008 and 2012.

Career statistics

123 games and 6 goals in state league
214 games and 7 goals in state league
33 games in 2010 Campeonato do Nordeste.

References

External links

CBF 
 

Brazilian footballers
Brazilian expatriate footballers
Bangu Atlético Clube players
Mirassol Futebol Clube players
Rangers F.C. players
Birmingham City F.C. players
UD Salamanca players
Albacete Balompié players
UD Las Palmas players
Alicante CF footballers
Aris Thessaloniki F.C. players
Cerro Porteño players
Universidad de Las Palmas CF footballers
South China AA players
Espérance Sportive de Tunis players
English Football League players
La Liga players
Hong Kong First Division League players
Expatriate footballers in Scotland
Expatriate footballers in England
Expatriate footballers in Spain
Expatriate footballers in Greece
Expatriate footballers in Paraguay
Expatriate footballers in Tunisia
Expatriate footballers in Hong Kong
Association football forwards
Brazilian people of Italian descent
Citizens of Italy through descent
Sportspeople from Paraná (state)
Brazilian expatriate sportspeople in Hong Kong
1979 births
Living people
Al-Ittihad Kalba SC players
UAE First Division League players